John Roderick Bestall (born 25 February 1963) is a former field hockey player from Australia. He competed at both the 1988 Summer Olympics and the 1992 Summer Olympics, winning the silver medal with the Australian team in 1992.

External links
 
 Sport-Reference.com/Olympics

1963 births
Australian male field hockey players
Olympic field hockey players of Australia
Olympic silver medalists for Australia
Field hockey players at the 1988 Summer Olympics
Field hockey players at the 1992 Summer Olympics
Living people
Olympic medalists in field hockey
Medalists at the 1992 Summer Olympics
20th-century Australian people